KSRV-FM (96.1 MHz) is a commercial FM radio station licensed to Ontario, Oregon, and broadcasting to the Boise metropolitan area.  KSRV-FM is owned by Iliad Media Group and airs an adult hits radio format known as "Bob FM 96.1."  The studios and offices are on East Franklin Road in Nampa, Idaho.

KSRV-FM has an effective radiated power (ERP) of 47,000 watts.  The transmitter is off Shafer Butte Road in Horseshoe Bend, Idaho, amid the towers for other Boise-area FM and TV stations.  The signal covers a large section of Western Idaho and a small section of Eastern Oregon.

History

Top 40 (1977-1987) 
On July 4, 1977, the station signed on as KXBQ.  It was owned by Ontario Broadcasting Company and aired a contemporary Top 40 format.  In 1982, it was acquired by Capps Broadcasting, which also owned AM 1380 KSRV.

Adult contemporary (1987-200?) 
In 1987, it switched its call sign to KSRV-FM, airing an adult contemporary format, while the AM station played country music. At the time, KSRV-FM only broadcast at 27,000 watts from a 280 foot tower, so its signal did not reach the larger Boise market. It was later that the power was nearly doubled and the transmitter moved to a much taller tower near Boise, making its signal competitive with other FM stations in the Boise radio market, as a "move-in" station.

Country (200?-2007) 
KSRV-FM aired a country music format branded as "The Bull".

Adult hits (2007-present) 
On March 30, 2007, the country format was dropped in favor of an adult hits format, branded as "Bob FM". Boise is one of the rare markets with competing adult hits stations. Along with KSRV, KJOT airs a similar format as "Jack FM."

KSRV-HD2
On October 7, 2021, KSRV-FM launched a sports format on its HD2 subchannel, branded as "Fox Sports Boise".

References

External links
KSRV-FM official website

SRV-FM
SRV-FM
Adult hits radio stations in the United States
Bob FM stations
Ontario, Oregon
Radio stations established in 1977
1977 establishments in Oregon